Maronea may refer to:

 Maronea (lichen), a genus of lichen in the family Fuscideaceae
 Maroneia, a municipality in the Rhodope regional unit, Greece
 Maroneia (Attica) a place in the south of the Attica peninsula, Greece.